The sixteenth season of Law & Order: Special Victims Unit debuted on Wednesday, September 24, 2014, at 9pm/8c (Eastern), and concluded on Wednesday, May 20, 2015, on NBC.

Production
Law & Order: Special Victims Unit was renewed for a sixteenth season on May 7, 2014, by NBC. and premiered on September 24, 2014. Production on the season commenced on May 22, with the shooting of first episode, entitled "Girls Disappeared", completed in early June. A second episode was also completed during June with the third scheduled episode being pushed back until after the production hiatus to give rest to the cast and crew.

Executive producer Warren Leight revealed that the sixteenth season would follow the events of the previous season finale, with Detective Nick Amaro (Danny Pino) "sent to the bowels of Queens to do traffic stops". Prior to the conclusion of the fifteenth season and hence Sergeant Olivia Benson's (Mariska Hargitay) fostering of baby Noah Porter, Raúl Esparza (Rafael Barba) revealed that, "Benson has a very big, life-changing event take place for her, which I think is gonna last for a while...she might make some choices that are really gonna change her life."

NBC President Robert Greenblatt announced that Chicago PD, Chicago Fire, and also Law & Order: Special Victims Unit, could continue to have crossover episodes during the 2014–15 season. The episode entitled "Chicago Crossover" aired on November 12, 2014, as part of a crossover between Chicago P.D., Chicago Fire, and SVU. Additionally, the episode entitled "Daydream Believer", served as the second crossover with the three aforementioned shows.

Cast

Main cast

 Mariska Hargitay as Sergeant Olivia Benson 
 Danny Pino as Police Officer / Junior / Senior Detective Nick Amaro
 Kelli Giddish as Junior Detective Amanda Rollins
 Ice-T as Senior Detective Odafin "Fin" Tutuola
 Peter Scanavino as Junior Detective Dominick "Sonny" Carisi, Jr.
 Raúl Esparza as Assistant District Attorney Rafael Barba

Special guest stars
 Tamara Tunie as Medical Examiner Dr. Melinda Warner
 Dann Florek as Donald "Don" Cragen

Crossover stars
 Jason Beghe as Chicago Police Department Sergeant Hank Voight (Crossing over with Chicago P.D.)
 Sophia Bush as Chicago Police Department Detective Erin Lindsay (Crossing over with Chicago P.D.)
 Jesse Lee Soffer as Chicago Police Department Detective Jay Halstead (Crossing over with Chicago P.D.)
 Marina Squerciati as Chicago Police Department Officer Kim Burgess (Crossing over with Chicago P.D.)
 Brian Geraghty as Chicago Police Department Officer Sean Roman (Crossing over with Chicago P.D.)
 Stella Maeve as Nadia Decotis (Crossing over with Chicago P.D.)

Recurring cast

 Donal Logue as Lieutenant Declan Murphy
 Bronwyn Reed as Lucy Huston
 Robert John Burke as  Internal Affairs Bureau Lieutenant Ed Tucker
 Peter Gallagher as Deputy Chief William Dodds
 Jefferson Mays as Medical Examiner Dr. Carl Rudnick
 Delaney Williams as Defense Attorney John Buchanan
 Peter Hermann as Defense Attorney Trevor Langan
 Michael Kostroff as Defense Attorney Evan Braun
 Jenna Stern as Judge Elana Barth
 Thedra Porter as Chantal Jackson
 Jamila Velazquez as Pilar Morenas
 Nikki M. James as Detective Gail Dunbar
 Myk Watford as Atlanta Police Department Captain Sam Reynolds
 Elizabeth Marvel as Defense Attorney Rita Calhoun
 Harry Hamlin as Atlanta Police Department Deputy Chief Charles Patton
 Aida Turturro as Judge Felicia Catano

 Charles Halford as Johnny "D" Drake
 Lili Taylor as Martha Thornhill
 Danika Yarosh as Ariel Thornhill
 Hoda Kotb as herself
 Jessica Phillips as Assistant District Attorney Pippa Cox
 Stephen C. Bradbury as Judge Colin McNamara
 Steve Rosen as Defence Attorney Michael Guthrie
 Tabitha Holbert as Assistant District Attorney Rose Callier
 Ami Brabson as Judge Karyn Blake
 Sonia Manzano as Judge Gloria Pepitone
 Vincent Curatola as Judge Al Burtuccio
 Yvonna Kopacz-Wright as Dr. Darby Wilder
 Michael Mastro as Judge Serani
 Leslie Odom Jr. as Reverend Curtis Scott
 Caris Vujcec as Detective Louise Campesi
 Dashiell Eaves as Sergeant Kevin Donlan

Guest stars

Peter Scanavino joined, originally in a recurring capacity, as Detective Dominick "Sonny" Carisi Jr., beginning with the season premiere episode "Girls Disappeared". Detective Carisi is "going to come in [to SVU] and shake things up...a guy who maybe needs a little bit of refining". Starting with the fifth episode of the season, Scanavino was upgraded to a regular cast member. Scanavino previously appeared in the season fourteen episode "Monster's Legacy" as another character.

Peter Gallagher joins this season, in a recurring capacity, as Deputy Chief William Dodds, the head of all the Special Victims Units in New York City.

Teri Polo of the ABC Family series The Fosters guest stars in the second episode, "American Disgrace", as Cordelia. Polo previously appeared in the season ten episode "Confession" as another character. Stacy Keach, Henry Simmons and Sandy Duncan also guest star.

Ron Rifkin returns to SVU portraying defense attorney Marvin Exley in an episode that aired in October, "Producer’s Backend". Exley represents Tensley (portrayed by Stevie Lynn Jones), a young Hollywood celebrity in conflict with the law. Brian d'Arcy James stars as the top-level producer who gave Tensley a score. Dana Wheeler-Nicholson also guest stars as Tensley's mother.

Chicago P.D.s Sophia Bush (Det. Erin Lindsay), Jesse Lee Soffer (Det. Jay Halstead), and Jason Beghe (Sgt. Hank Voight) take part in a crossover event between Chicago Fire, Chicago P.D. and SVU in the November episode "Chicago Crossover". Specifically, they are involved in a joint case involving child sex internet ring. Additionally, Bush and Soffer, with Marina Squerciati (Ofc. Burgess), Brian Geraghty (Ofc. Roman) and Stella Maeve (Nadia Decotis), also took part in the second crossover event between the three shows ("Daydream Believer"). In this episode, SVU works with Chicago Intelligence on a rape/murder case connected to an apartment fire in the Chicago Fire episode "We Called Her Jellybean" and pursue the suspect they're forced to let go in the Chicago P.D. episode "The Number of Rats".

Harry Hamlin guest starred in an episode that aired on December 10, "Pattern Seventeen" as Rollins' previous commanding-officer in Atlanta, Deputy Chief Patton. Peter Hermann also guest starred in this episode as defense attorney Trevor Langan. Hamlin made a further appearance in the January 7 episode "Forgiving Rollins", alongside Don't Trust the B---- in Apartment 23 actress Dreama Walker. Walker portrays Reese Taymor, a detective from Atlanta who attends a law enforcement conference in New York, with Patton and accuses the latter of rape.

"Agent Provocateur" features guest appearances from Tony Award winner Patti LuPone alongside of former Smash star and Tony nominee Jeremy Jordan. LuPone plays a Hollywood agent and Jordan her newest star who both become involved when their actor colleague is accused of rape. Jordan previously appeared in the 2008 episode "Streetwise", while LuPone made appearances on the original Law & Order series.

Armand Assante guest starred in "Padre Sandunguero" as Nicholas, Detective Amaro's father. The episode also featured the second appearance of Tony winner Nikki M. James as a detective. James previously appeared as a 911 Operator in the 2012 episode "Father Dearest".

Tamara Tunie returned after a long absence as Dr. Melinda Warner in the February 18 episode "Undercover Mother", alongside Donal Logue as lieutenant Declan Murphy after his five episode arc last season. Tunie later appeared in "Daydream Believer".

In "December Solstice", Marcia Cross portrays Charmaine Briggs, the sixth wife of celebrity author Walter Briggs (played by Robert Vaughn), who is accused of sexually abusing her husband, by their step-daughters. This episode marks Cross' first television appearance since the 2012 finale of Desperate Housewives, of which she was part of the cast from 2004 to 2012. The episode marks Vaughn's final television prior to his death on November 11, 2016.

Andre Braugher returned to SVU as his season 13–14 recurring character defense attorney Bayard Ellis in the episode entitled "Perverted Justice". Ellis tried and set a jailed-father accused of raping his daughter, free, after she recants her testimony against him. Houses Robert Sean Leonard guest stars as ADA Kenneth O'Dwyer, who goes head-to-head with Ellis in court over the case. Alongside Braugher and Leonard, Dann Florek made a guest appearance in the same episode as Don Cragen. Cragen, previously a main character, who served as Captain of SVU from 1999 until the fifteenth season, assists Benson in re-opening the case and gathering evidence.

Episodes

Reception

References

16
2014 American television seasons
2015 American television seasons